Hirschfelder is a German surname. Notable people with the surname include:

 David Hirschfelder (born 1960), Australian musician and film score composer
 Egbert Hirschfelder (1942–2022), German rower
 Gerhard Hirschfelder (1907–1942), German Catholic priest and martyr
 Joseph O. Hirschfelder (1911–1990), American physicist

German-language surnames